Elefant is the spelling of elephant in several languages. It may refer to:
 Elefant, a German World War II tank destroyer
 SLT 50 Elefant, a tractor unit and tank transporter of the modern German Army
 Elefant (band), an indie band from New York, U.S.
 Elefant Records, a Spanish record label
 Elefant Traks, an Australian record label
Seeteufel, a prototype German submarine also known as Elefant

See also
 Elephant (disambiguation)
 Oliphant (disambiguation)